Hu Haoyue (born 1 June 2003) is a Chinese footballer currently playing as a midfielder for Suzhou Dongwu.

Career statistics

Club
.

References

2003 births
Living people
Chinese footballers
Association football midfielders
China League One players
Suzhou Dongwu F.C. players